The Martyrdom of the Holy Queen Shushanik (also translated as The Passion of Saint Shushanik) is the earliest surviving piece of Georgian literature. Purported to have been written between 476 and 483, the earliest surviving manuscript dates back to the 10th century and was written at Parkhali Monastery. There exists an Armenian translation of the same text, dated also to the 10th century. The author is Iakob Tsurtaveli (Jacob of Tsurtavi), a contemporary and participant in the events described in this hagiographic novel. 

The manuscript describes the martyrdom of Saint Shushanik, an Armenian noblewoman, at the hand of her spouse, bidaxshe (high prince) Varsken, who had renounced Christianity and embraced Zoroastrianism. Shushanik, whose father was Vardan Mamikonyan, the sparapet (military leader) of the Christians in Armenia, refused to follow him, and died as a martyr after years of imprisonment and torture.

The first printed version was published in 1882. It has been translated into Russian, French, English, German, Spanish, Hungarian and Icelandic. In 1979, UNESCO marked the 1,500th anniversary of the Martyrdom of the Holy Queen Shushanik.

References

Sources
Bart D Ehrman, Andrew Jacobs, editors, Christianity in Late Antiquity, 300-450 C.E: A Reader, Oxford University Press US,  pages 499-504
Donald Rayfield, The Literature of Georgia: A History, Routledge (UK)  page 42

External links
English translation of the Martyrdom by Rev. K.V. Maksoudian

Christian hagiography
Old Georgian literature
Works about violence against women
Martyrdom in fiction